The 1884 Men's tennis tour was the ninth annual tennis tour, consisting of 63 tournaments it began in April in Nuwara Eliya, Ceylon and ended in December in Melbourne, Australia.

Summary of tour 
Herbert Lawford wins the Irish Lawn Tennis Championships at his 3rd attempt in Dublin defeating Ernest Renshaw in straight sets. William Renshaw a fourth consecutive Wimbledon Championship. Former Wimbledon champion Donald Stewart wins the Northern Championship in Liverpool against Herbert Wilberforce. In America Richard Sears collects a fourth successive US National Championship beating Howard Taylor in straight sets.

The title leader this season was Charles Walder Grinstead winning 5 tournaments from 5 finals.

Calendar 
Notes 1: Challenge Round: the final round of a tournament, in which the winner of a single-elimination phase faces the previous year's champion, who plays only that one match. The challenge round was used in the early history of tennis (from 1877 through 1921), in some tournaments not all.* Indicates challenger
Key

Men's 1884 Tennis tour included:

January 
No events

February 
No events

March 
No eventsApril

 May 

 June 

 July 

 August 

 September 

 October 

 November No Events''

 December 

 Rankings Source:''' The Concise History of Tennis

Notes

References

Sources 
 Garcia, Gabriel (2018). "Tournament Roll of Honour - Worcesterships Championships - 1884-1970". thetennisbase.com. Madrid, Spain: Tennismem SAL.
 Gillmeister, Heiner (1998). Tennis:Cultural History. London: A&C Black. .
 "History - KZN Tennis". KZN Tennis. Kwazulu Natal Tennis Association. 2018.
 Mazak, Karoly (2017). The Concise History of Tennis. Independently published. .
 Nauright, John; Parrish, Charles (2012). Sports Around the World: History, Culture, and Practice. Santa Barbara, Calif.: ABC-CLIO. .
 Nieuwland, Alex (2009–2017). "Tournaments 1884". www.tennisarchives.com. Harlingen, Netherlands: Idzznew BV.

Further reading 
 Total Tennis:The Ultimate Tennis Encyclopedia, by Bud Collins, Sport Classic Books, Toronto, Canada, 
 The Tennis Book, edited by Michael Bartlett and Bob Gillen, Arbor House, New York, 1981 
 Ayre's Lawn Tennis Almanack And Tournament Guide, A. Wallis Myers
 Dunlop Lawn Tennis Almanack And Tournament Guide, G.P. Hughes
 Lowe's Lawn Tennis Annuals and Compendia, Lowe, Sir F. Gordon, Eyre & Spottiswoode.

External links 
 https://app.thetennisbase.com/1884 Men's Tennis Season
 http://www.tennisarchives.com/Tournaments 1884

Pre Open era tennis seasons
1884 in tennis